The modern Gagauz alphabet is a 31-letter Latin-based alphabet modelled on the Turkish alphabet. Previously, during Soviet rule, Gagauz's official script was Cyrillic. 

Gagauz was first written in Greek letters in the late 19th century. 

The current 31-letter Gagauz alphabet, used for the Gagauz language, is a Latin-based alphabet modelled after the Turkish and Azerbaijani.

History
It appears that the first alphabet to be used for the language was the Greek alphabet in the late 19th century. For example, orientalist Otto Blau claims that plays of Euripides had been translated into the Gagauz language and had been written with Greek letters.

Beginning in 1957, Cyrillic was used until 1993. On 13 May 1993, the parliament of the Republic of Moldova passed a decision providing for the official adoption of the Latin-based alphabet for the Gagauz language. This was subsequently amended in 1996. On the other hand, unlike Crimean Tatar, Turkish, and some other Turkic languages, Gagauz does not have the letter , which had become completely silent in the Gagauz language. Note that cedillas should be used instead of commas for Ç, Ş, and Ţ for consistency, since C with comma does not exist in Romanian and Turkish uses cedillas for Ç and Ş, although Ț is often seen.

Latin alphabet
In their standard order, the letters of the Gagauz alphabet are:

A, Ä, B, C, Ç, D, E, Ê, F, G, H, I, İ, J, K, L, M, N, O, Ö, P, R, S, Ş, T, Ţ, U, Ü, V, Y, Z.

Note that dotted and dotless I are separate letters, each with its own uppercase and lowercase form. I is the capital form of ı, and İ is the capital form of i. The Gagauz alphabet has no q, w or x. Instead, those characters are transliterated into Gagauz as k, v and ks, respectively.

Cyrillic alphabet (historical)

References

Latin alphabets
Gagauz language
Alphabets used by Turkic languages
Moldovan culture